Oued Naanaa is a small town and rural commune in Settat Province of the Chaouia-Ouardigha region of Morocco. At the time of the 2004 census, the commune had a total population of 7126 people living in 1158 households. It is mainly owned by the ' El Harkati ' Family which owns the vast majority of the wealth there (Houses , Land ...)

References

Populated places in Settat Province
Rural communes of Casablanca-Settat